Iain Moireach (John Murray) (27 March 1938 – 17 November 2018) was a Scottish Gaelic writer from Barvas, Isle of Lewis. He wrote poetry, screenplays, and short stories.

He published many short stories in the Gaelic magazines Gairm and Gath.

Life
Moireach was born in Barvas, Lewis. He was educated at the Nicolson Institute and at the University of Edinburgh. He taught at a school in Musselburgh. He was the editor for Comunn nan Leabhraichean since 1969.

He was the son of Finlay and Jessie Anne Murray (née MacLeod), and married his wife Nora Murray (Borve, Isle of Lewis) on 29 July 1968. Nora died on 5 April 2010.

Notable short stories
 'Am Bucas'
 'Am Partaidh'
 'Briseadh na Cloiche ' 
 'Dà mhionad, no Fracas' 
 'An Dealachadh' 
 'Feòil a' Gheamhraidh'  
 'Mo Chrannchur'

Books

Novels
 An rathad dhachaigh (Stornoway: Acair, 1994)

Short stories
 An Aghaigh Choimheach (1973)

Scripts
 Snìomh nan dual (Stornoway: Acair, 2007) consisting of:
 Feumaidh sinne bhith gàireachdainn
 Balaich a' chruidh 
 An coigreach 
 Rèiteach 
 An treas fàd

Editing
 Caimbeul, Aonghas. Suathadh ri iomadh rubha: eachdraidh a bheatha ed. Iain Moireach (Glasgow: Gairm, 1973)

References

External links
 Two short stories by Iain Moireach 

1938 births
2018 deaths
People from the Isle of Lewis
Scottish Gaelic writers
20th-century Scottish Gaelic poets
21st-century Scottish Gaelic poets